The Democratic People's Republic of Korea (commonly known as North Korea) first participated at the Olympic Games in 1964. The National Olympic Committee for North Korea is the Olympic Committee of the Democratic People's Republic of Korea, and was created in 1953 and recognized in 1957.

History
North Korea (Democratic People's Republic of Korea) first participated at the Olympic Games in 1964, appearing only in the Winter Olympic Games that year. Eight years later in 1972, the nation first participated at the Summer Olympic Games. Since then, the nation has appeared in every Summer Games, except when North Korea joined the Soviet-led boycott of the 1984 Summer Olympics, when they boycotted the 1988 Games in Seoul, South Korea, and in 2020, citing COVID-19 concerns.

North Korea's attendance at the Winter Games has been sporadic; eight of the last thirteen Games have included a North Korean team.

During the 1998-2007 Sunshine Policy era, North Korea and South Korea symbolically marched as one team at the opening ceremonies of the 2000, 2004, and 2006 Olympics, but competed separately.

North Korea sent 22 athletes to compete in five sports at the 2018 Winter Olympics in Pyeongchang, South Korea. As in 2000 and 2004, North and South Korean athletes marched together at the opening ceremonies. A unified women's ice hockey team included players from both North and South Korea. North Korean athletes also competed in alpine skiing, figure skating, short track speed skating and cross-country skiing.

Alongside the 22 athletes, North Korea sent a delegation of 400 supporters to the 2018 games. This delegation, led by North Korea's ceremonial head of state Kim Yong-nam, included cheerleaders, taekwondo practitioners and an orchestra.

North Korean athletes have won a total of 57 medals, two of which were won at the Winter Games. Government funding plays a major role in Korea's success. Elite athletes often enjoy highly developed facilities and luxurious lifestyles, compared with their peers.

In 2018, the United Nations, due to conflicts, rejected an exemption to sanctions for sporting equipment to help athletes prepare for the 2020 Summer Olympics being sent to North Korea.

On 6 April 2021, North Korea announced it would not participate in the 2020 Summer Olympics due to COVID-19 concerns. Accordingly, on 8 September 2021, the International Olympic Committee made a decision to suspend North Korea from its activities until the end of 2022 and ban participation in the 2022 Winter Olympics in Beijing.

Medal tables

Medals by Summer Games

Medals by Winter Games

Medals by summer sport

Medals by winter sport

List of medalists

Summer Olympics

Winter Olympics

See also 

 List of flag bearers for North Korea at the Olympics
 North Korea at the Paralympics
 Sport in North Korea
 :Category:Olympic competitors for North Korea

References

Works cited

External links